Frazer is both a given name and a surname. It is the Anglicized form of the Gaelic personal name Frasach (the generous/fruitful one). It was the epithet for an 8th-century Irish high king Niall Frossach (or Frasach) mac Fergaile.

Notable people with the name include:

Given name
Frazer Hines, British actor
Frazer Irving, British comic artist
Frazer Richardson (born 1982), English footballer

Surname
Augustus Simon Frazer (1776–1835), British Army officer during the Napoleonic Wars
Bob Frazer, Canadian actor
Charles Fraser (botanist) (1788–1831), Scottish-born botanist and explorer in Australia
Dan Frazer, American actor
Gordon Frazer, Australian engineer
Ian Frazer, Scottish-Australian physician and scientist, joint inventor of the HPV vaccine
Jendayi Frazer, U.S. Assistant Secretary of State for African Affairs
James George Frazer (1854–1941), Scottish social anthropologist, author of The Golden Bough
James S. Frazer (1824-1893), American judge and politician
John Frazer, British architect
J. D. Frazer, pen name Illiad, artist and writer of the webcomic User Friendly
Joseph W. Frazer, American automobile executive
Lily Frazer (born 1988), British actress
Lucy Frazer, British M.P.
Margaret Frazer (1946–2013), American writer
Persifor Frazer (1736–1792), American Revolutionary officer
Ron Frazer (1928–1983), Australian actor and comedian
Tess Frazer, American actress
William C. Frazer (1776–1838) U.S. federal territorial judge

Fictional characters
Frazer Yeats, a character from the Network Ten soap opera Neighbours
Chloe Frazer, a character from the video game Uncharted franchise
Private James Frazer, a character in the British television sitcom Dad's Army

See also
Fraser (surname)